Live Wired is a live album by Vancouver industrial band Front Line Assembly, released in 1996, with the majority of tracks coming from the bands previous two studio albums; Millennium and Hard Wired.  A box set including the two CDs plus a VHS with all of the band's video clips to date (except "Mindphaser" and "Body Count"), and a live concert video (from the show in Chemnitz 1995, different from the one on CD) was released at the same time.

Track listing

Personnel

Front Line Assembly
 Bill Leeb – vocals, keyboard, percussion, production
 Rhys Fulber – keyboard, percussion, production

Additional live musicians
 Adrian White – drums, percussion
 Jed Simon – guitar, drums

Production and other personnel

 Greg Reely – sound engineering, recording, mixing
 Tim Oberthier – monitor engineering
 Elk H. – tour management
 Thorsten S. – press
 Torsten J. – backliner
 Nicole S. – merchandising
 Jos – video
 Ed – light
 (Flash) Gordon – driver

 Sven Schirm – photography
 Torsten Balzer – photography
 Thorsten Stroht – photography
 Katalyn Illes – photography
 Rod Chong – video interview directing
 Dave McKean – design, illustration
 Jürgen Heidelbach – booklet layout
 Christian Poeck – live video directing
 Steven Enderlein – live video editing

 Manfred Gremmer – live video editing
 Olaf Ave – live video camera
 Steven Enderlein – live video camera
 Christian Poeck – live video camera
 Lars Schreiber – live video camera
 Christine Ziesmer – live video camera
 Christian Poeck – live video executive production
 Gösta Oelstrom – live video executive production, live video production
 Uwe Praetel – live video production

References

Front Line Assembly albums
1996 live albums
Albums with cover art by Dave McKean
Video albums by Canadian artists
Metropolis Records albums
Front Line Assembly live albums
Albums produced by Rhys Fulber